"Pinocchio en hiver (Kalinka)" is a song by French virtual singer Pinocchio. Released as a single in October 2005, it debuted at number 8 in France.

The song would also appear on Pinocchio's debut album, Mon Alboum!, which would be out a month later.

Track listing

Charts

References 

2005 songs
2005 singles
Pinocchio (singer) songs
EMI Music France singles
Russian songs